Rose Daughter is a retelling of the fairytale Beauty and the Beast by Robin McKinley, published in 1997. It is the second retelling of the tale that McKinley has written: the first being her 1978 story, Beauty: A Retelling of the Story of Beauty & the Beast.

An unabridged audio-book recording was released in 2013 by Recorded Books, narrated by Bianca Amato, and is available via Audible.com.

Plot summary
A merchant loses all his money when his ships are lost at sea, and is forced to move his three daughters to a lonely countryside house called Rose Cottage which was left to his youngest, Beauty, in a will, and thus is not subject to his creditors. The garden of the house is full of strange thorny bushes and vines, which neither of the merchant nor his three daughters can identify. Beauty asks in the town and discovers that they are the roses the cottage are called after and begins to tend them, because she loves gardening and she remembers the smell of her mother's rose perfume. Roses are very rare because only great magic or great love can grow them. The roses bloom under Beauty's care, and the sisters sells wreaths of them in the town. After some time, the merchant hears word that one of his ships might have made it back and journeys to find out if it's true. He asks his daughters what presents they would like him to bring back, and Beauty requests a rose, as her bush has not blossomed that year because it has been so cold and rainy and miserable.

The ship had come in, but the creditors had remembered the merchant's old debts and seized upon the goods before he could reach them. A man who had once worked as his clerk and was now employed by a rival had let the merchant stay with him, but his employer found out and demanded that he be turned out. Finding that he was nothing but bad luck in that city, the merchant refused another offer of aid and set out to make his way home on a stout pony allowed to be lent to him, in spite of the fierce winter weather. On the way he gets lost in a snow storm, and ends up at a magnificent castle where he is given food and shelter. As he is leaving he notices a beautiful rose on a table and decides to take it back for Beauty. This enrages the castle's owner - a terrifying beast. When the merchant explains his actions, the Beast agrees to let him go on the condition that Beauty comes to live with him in the castle.

The main part of the book follows the basic plot of the fairy tale Beauty and the Beast but with a few alterations: Beauty stays at the house for what seems to be seven days, during which she revives the roses in the Beast's greenhouse and calls small creatures (bats, birds, frogs/toads, hedgehogs) back to the palace, and the Beast has filled the roof of his mansion with beautiful paintings. During her time in the castle, Beauty dreams every night of her family, and when she speaks to the Beast of how real her dreams seem and how strange they are, with the amount of time passing in them, he admits to her that they are true reflections of reality, and Beauty is distressed to have missed so much of her sisters' lives. She begs to be allowed to return home to visit, which he allows, but warns her that if she does not return to him by placing a petal on her tongue before the last petal falls from the rose he gives her, he will die.

When Beauty returns to the Beast and declares her love for him, she is given a choice. Either the Beast returns to his human form and regains his wealth and power, thereby also returning her family to their former status, or he stays as is and they live a peaceful peasant life in the village. Told that their names would be spoken throughout the land if she chooses the former, she asks how they will be spoken, and on hearing that it would be in fear and dread her choice is easily made. The pair return home to Rose Cottage, to Jeweltongue and Lionheart and the merchant, and all three girls are married to their respective beaus.

Artist's book
Anne Bachelier has illustrated Rose Daughter in a limited edition as Rose Daughter-A Re-Telling of Beauty and the Beast.

Reception
In comparing it to McKinley's previous adaptation of Beauty and the Beast, Kathryn Harrison wrote in The New York Times, "Ironically, this reworking has disabled the fairy tale, robbing it of tension and meaning, and creating for her readers a less usable enchantment."

Further reading
 "Reflection and Reflexion: Female Coming-of-Age, the Mirror Stage, and the Absence of Mirrors in Robin McKinley's Beauty and Rose Daughter" by Evelyn Perry

References

External links

 

American fantasy novels
1997 American novels
Greenwillow Books books
Novels based on fairy tales
Novels by Robin McKinley
Works based on Beauty and the Beast